Sanga (also Igbunbu) is a Local Government Area in southern Kaduna State, Nigeria. Its headquarters is in the town of Gbantu (Hausa: Gwantu). The Local Government Council is chaired by Bisallah Malam. It has an area of 1,821 km and had a population of 151,485 at the 2006 census. The postal code of the area is 801.

Boundaries
Sanga Local Government Area shares boundaries with just a single local government area in southern Kaduna State, Jema'a Local Government Area to the west. The rest of its boundaries are shared with Plateau State to the east and Nasarawa State to the south respectively.

Population
Sanga Local Government Area according to the March 21, 2006 national population census was put at 151,485. Its population was projected by the National Population Commission of Nigeria and National Bureau of Statistics to be 204,500 by March 21, 2016.

People
The people of Sanga Local Government Area include the Ninzam, Numana, Ninte, Mada (Mœda), Nungu and others of related origin, spoken language and historic affiliations.

Administrative subdivisions 
Sanga Local Government ha 10 wards and subdivisions; namely

Wasa
Arak
Nandu 
Gwantu
Ninzo North
Ninzo South
Ninzo West 
Ayu 
Bokana 
Aboro 
Karshi

Languages 
Sanga, being a Local Government Area in southern part of Kaduna state, shares boundaries with Akwanga, in Nassarawa state and Riyom, in Plateau State.

Numana as well as Ninzo are among the main spoken languages in the area, spoken both in Sanga and neighbouring LGAs like Jema'a, in Kaduna State.
Mada (Mœda), being one of the languages widely spoken in Akwanga, Kokona, Keffi and Karu Local Government Areas of Nassarawa State and Sanga and Jema'a Local Government Areas of Kaduna state of Nigeria. Some of these Mada communities have settled in Sanga for more than two centuries, there are communities in Sanga that are solely Mada-speaking.

Ayu and Ahwai are also spoken in Sanga LGA.

2014 attacks 
On 27 June 2014:
In Sanga LGA of Kaduna State, 32 people were killed by gunmen suspected to be Fulani militia ... Amber, a village of about 5,000 people, was ransacked ... In Paa, a village close to Gwantu, the town was attacked ... Ten people were killed. The town is also burnt down ... All Ninzom villages, including Gwantu, the LGA, headquarters of Sanga, were deserted as people ran to police stations, primary and secondary schools in nearby towns and into neighbouring states ... The tense situation in the area was making distribution of relief materials to about 50,000 displaced persons almost impossible."

Notable people
Obadiah Mailafia, economist, politician
Hadiza Sabuwa Balarabe medical doctor, politician

References 

Local Government Areas in Kaduna State